Gheorge Fiat (14 January 1929 – 22 August 2010) was a lightweight boxer from Romania who won a bronze medal at the 1952 Olympics. He took up boxing following his brother Peter, and later won seven national titles. He retired in 1957 and had a long career as a coach for his club Steaua Bucareşti and as an organizer of boxing tournaments for youths.

References

1929 births
2010 deaths
Olympic boxers of Romania
Olympic bronze medalists for Romania
Boxers at the 1952 Summer Olympics
Olympic medalists in boxing
Romanian male boxers
Medalists at the 1952 Summer Olympics
Lightweight boxers
20th-century Romanian people